Li'l Elvis and the Truckstoppers  is an animated musical children's television series and the Australian Children's Television Foundation's (ACTF's) first joint venture under the Distinctly Australian Program introduced by the Australian Prime Minister Paul Keating. The Director of the ACTF Dr Patricia Edgar selected Peter Viska's character Li'l Elvis to design and co-produce the ACTF's first long-form 26-episode-series animation. As an original concept, not commissioned from overseas or based on an adaption of a classic story, production of the series on this scale was a massive undertaking for the Australian animation industry. With Li'l Elvis, an $11.5 million project, the ACTF opened up a new overseas market in partnership with France 2 and France Animation, a French production company, and Ravensburger, a German distributor, with the financial participation of Centre national de la cinématographie. A team of 90 animators and artists worked for 18 months including 39 trainees were employed on the production in support roles.

Plot
The story follows a group of children and their adventures in outback Australia.

The title character of the show, Li'l Elvis, who is a ten-year-old boy with the weight of the world on his shoulders. He has a gift for music, a talent for trouble, and a desire for only one thing: to find out who he really is and be a normal kid again. The opening sequence and music reveal that he was thrown out of a gold Cadillac in a guitar case, hinting that he is the illegitimate child of Elvis Presley (in real life, Presley only had one daughter named Lisa Marie). He is raised by foster parents, truck-stop proprietors Grace and Len, who are fervent fans of Presley. As Li'l Elvis is musically talented, singing and playing the guitar, his foster mother is convinced he is the son of Presley.

Li'l Elvis and his two friends, Lionel and Janet, form the band "The Truckstoppers", and the show follows their adventures in the outback town of Little Memphis (formerly Wanapoo). Lionel is an Indigenous Australian boy who plays the didgeridoo and has a penchant for exclaiming "deadly", while Janet is a beret-wearing Asian Australian girl who plays the drums standing up, similar to The Velvet Underground's drummer Maureen Tucker.

The Truckstoppers' recurring enemy is the businessman W.C. Moore, who wants to become their manager to exploit them commercially, turning Little Memphis into a tourist attraction. He is also infatuated with finding deposits of the mysterious mineral Berkonium. He has a Berkonium marble, which he uses to beat children at the game of marbles, their major recreational activity. He also frequently electrically zaps his hapless limousine driver, Duncan.

Characters

Main
 Li'l Elvis Jones – voiced by Stig Wemyss (Wendy Stapleton provides singing vocals) − Li'l Elvis, who is a ten-year-old boy with the weight of the world on his shoulders. He has a gift for music, a talent for trouble, and a desire for only one thing: to find out who he really is and be a normal kid again. The opening sequence and music reveal that he was thrown out of a gold Cadillac in a guitar case, hinting that he is the illegitimate child of Elvis Presley (in real life, Presley only had one daughter named Lisa Marie). He is raised by foster parents, truck-stop proprietors Grace and Len, who are fervent fans of Presley. As Li'l Elvis is musically talented, singing and playing the guitar, his foster mother is convinced he is the son of Presley.
 Lionel Dexter – voiced by Kylie Belling − Lionel is an Indigenous Australian boy who plays the didgeridoo and has a penchant for exclaiming "deadly". He is a friend of Li'l Elvis.  Aboriginal actor and musician Tom E Lewis provided Lionel's didgeridoo playing.
 Janet Rig – voiced by Marg Downey − Janet is a beret-wearing Asian Australian girl who plays the drums standing up, similar to The Velvet Underground's drummer Maureen Tucker. She is also a friend of Li'l Elvis.
 W.C. Moore – voiced by Bill Ten Eyck − W.C. is an antagonistic businessman who wants to become their manager to exploit them commercially, turning Little Memphis into a tourist attraction. He is also infatuated with finding deposits of the mysterious mineral Berkonium. He has a Berkonium marble, which he uses to beat children at the game of marbles, their major recreational activity
 Duncan – voiced by Michael Veitch − Duncan is a hapless limousine driver.
 Grace Jones – voiced by Lynda Gibson − She is the adoptive mother of Li'l Elvis.
 Len Jones – voiced by David Cotter − He is the adoptive father of Li'l Elvis.

Minor
 Spike − Spike is a juvenile delinquent who picks on Li'l Elvis and is mostly on Moore's side.
 Old Man Viska − Old Man Viska is an elderly European man who runs the local junkyard and is a retired firefighter and miner; he was present for the events that led to the legend of Old Man Izard.
 Old Man Izard − Old Man Izard is a European miner who was never found after a cave-in in the mines beneath the town; his ghost is said haunt the now-closed mines.

Episodes

Season 1 (1997)

Season 2 (1998) 
 #1 – Kidnapped
 #2 – Good Boy, Cruel World
 #3 – Space Junk
 #4 – RoboPop
 #5 – Hopping Mad
 #6 – Big Top Brouhaha – Haha
 #7 – Billionairiosis
 #8 – Cardaholic
 #9 – Know All
 #10 – The Good, The Bad and the Hanky
 #11 – Schmiko
 #12 – Minors in the Mine
 #13 – The Meanie From Down Under (final episode)

See also 
 List of Australian television series

References

External links
 Episode Synopsis
 
 Chris Anastassiades
 Cameron Clarke
 John Armstrong
 Gene Conkie
 Ray Boseley
 Mark Hopkins
 Kevin Nemeth
 Susie Campbell
 Wain Fimeri
 Susan MacGillicuddy
 Vicki Madden
 Esben Storm
 Pepe Trevor
 Australian Television Children's Foundation, Li'l Elvis Jones and the Truckstoppers Series 1

Australian children's animated television series
French children's animated television series
German children's animated television series
Australian Broadcasting Corporation original programming
1997 Australian television series debuts
1997 French television series debuts
1997 German television series debuts
1998 Australian television series endings
1998 French television series endings
1998 German television series endings
1990s Australian animated television series
1990s French animated television series
1990s German animated television series
Television shows set in Australia
Australian children's animated musical television series
French children's animated musical television series
German children's animated musical television series
Animated television series about children